These are the 2007 Guildford Council election, full results.  A summary of these results can be found at 2007 Guildford Council election.

Results

Ash South & Tongham

Ash Vale

Ash Wharf

Burpham

Christchurch

Clandon & Horsley

Effingham

Friary & St. Nicolas

Holy Trinity

Merrow

Normandy

Onslow

Pilgrims

Pirbright

Send

Shalford

Stoke

Stoughton

Tillingbourne

Westborough

Worplesdon

References

2007 full results
2007 English local elections
2000s in Surrey